Graziella Branduardi-Raymont is an Italian physicist. She is a professor at University College London's Mullard Space Science Laboratory (MSSL).

Biography 
After obtaining a degree in Physics from the University of Milan in 1973, in 1974 Branduardi-Raymont began studying for a PhD at University College London's Mullard Space Science Laboratory (MSSL). She finished her PhD in X-ray Astronomy in 1977 and subsequently moved to the Center for Astrophysics  Harvard & Smithsonian.

She returned to MSSL in 1979 as a Research Assistant before achieving lecturership in 1987 and becoming a Reader in Astronomy in 1992. During the 1990s she took on the role of MSSL Project Manager for the Digital Electronics of the Reflection Grating Spectrometer flying onboard ESA's XMM-Newton mission. In 2009, she was appointed Professor of Space Astronomy. Her current research is focused on planetary X-ray emission alongside her role as Co-PI for the joint ESA - Chinese Academy of Sciences SMILE mission that is scheduled to launch in 2024.

Research interests 

Branduardi-Raymont's research interests include:
 X-ray binaries
 X-ray background
 Active Galactic Nuclei (AGN)
 Planetary X-ray emission

Space missions 
 Co-Investigator of the Reflection Grating Spectrometer on the ESA XMM-Newton mission.
 Co-Principal Investigator of the ESA - CAS SMILE mission.

See also 
List of women in leadership positions on astronomical instrumentation projects

References 

Year of birth missing (living people)
Living people
21st-century women scientists
20th-century women scientists
Academics of University College London
Women astrophysicists
Planetary scientists
Women planetary scientists
20th-century Italian scientists
21st-century Italian scientists
Italian astrophysicists
University of Milan alumni